The 2016–17 Florida Gators men's basketball team represented the University of Florida in the 2016–17 NCAA Division I men's basketball season. The Gators, led by second year head coach Mike White, competed in the Southeastern Conference (SEC) and played their home games at the Exactech Arena at the Stephen C. O'Connell Center on the university's Gainesville, Florida campus. They finished the season 27–9, 14–4 in SEC play to finish in second place. They lost in the quarterfinals of the SEC tournament to Vanderbilt. They received an at-large bid to the NCAA tournament where they defeated East Tennessee State, Virginia, and Wisconsin before losing to fellow SEC member South Carolina in the Elite Eight.

Previous season
The Gators finished the 2015–16 season 21–15, 9–9 in SEC play to finish in a tie for eighth place. They lost to Texas A&M in the quarterfinals of the SEC tournament. They received an invitation to the National Invitation Tournament, where they defeated North Florida and Ohio State to advance to the quarterfinals where they lost to  George Washington.

Offseason

Departures

Incoming transfers

2016 recruiting class

2017 recruiting class

Roster

Schedule and results

|-
!colspan=12 style=| Exhibition

|-
!colspan=12 style=| Regular season

|-
!colspan=12 style=| SEC Tournament

|-
!colspan=12 style=| NCAA tournament

Rankings

*AP does not release post-NCAA tournament rankings

See also
 2016–17 Florida Gators women's basketball team

References

Florida Gators men's basketball seasons
Florida
Florida